Several companies provide rail transport in Portugal.

 Comboios de Portugal
 Fertagus
 Lisbon Metro
 Porto Metro
 Metro Transportes do Sul (light rail)

Portugal is a member of the International Union of Railways (UIC). The UIC Country Code for Portugal is 94. There are rail links with Spain, which uses the same Iberian broad gauge.

Network

Infraestruturas de Portugal is the rail network administrating company, taking over control from REFER on 1 June 2015.

The length of Portugal's railway system is as follows:
 Total: 
 Iberian gauge:   gauge ( electrified) 
 Metre gauge:   gauge (2006)

See also

History of rail transport in Portugal
List of Portuguese locomotives and railcars
Narrow gauge railways in Portugal

References